The IEEE Cledo Brunetti Award is an award is presented for outstanding contributions to nanotechnology and miniaturization in the electronics arts. It may be presented to an individual or a team of up to three. The award was established in 1975 by the IEEE Board of Directors.  

Recipients of this award receive bronze medal, a certificate and honorarium.

Basis for judging: In the evaluation process, the following criteria are considered: innovation, development, social value, uniqueness of concept, other technical accomplishments, and the quality of the nomination.

Nomination deadline: 31 January

Notification: Recipients are typically approved during the June IEEE Board of Directors meeting, usually held towards the end of the month. Recipients and their nominators will be notified following the meeting.  Subsequently, the nominators of unsuccessful candidates will be notified of the status of their nomination.

Presentation: IEEE policy requires that its awards be presented at major IEEE events that are in keeping with the nature of the award and the cited achievement.

Recipients 
Source 

 2021: Jesus Del Alamo
 2020: James H. Stathis and Ernest Yue Wu
 2019: Daniel C. Edelstein, Alfred Grill, and Chao-Kun Hu 
 2018: Siegfried Selberherr
 2017: Guido Groeseneken
 2016: Akira Toriumi
 2015: Hiroshi Iwai
 2014: Martin van den Brink
 2013: Giorgio Baccarani 
 2012: Yan Borodovsky and Sam Sivakumar
2011: Massimo V. Fischetti, David J. Frank, and Steven E. Laux
 2010: Ghavam Shahidi
 2009: Burn-Jeng Lin
 2008: Michel Bruel
 2007: Sandip Tiwari
 2006: Susumu Namba
 2005: William G. Oldham
 2004: Stephen Y. Chou
 2003: Andrew R.  Neureuther
 2002: Mark Lundstrom and Supriyo Datta
 2001: R. Fabian W. Pease 
 2000: Robert Fontana
 1999: David K. Ferry 
 1998: Roger T. Howe and Richard S. Muller
 1997: Dieter P. Kern,  George A. Sai-Halasz,  Matthew R. Wordeman
 1996: Mitsumasa Koyanagi 
 1995: Henry I. Smith 
 1994: Eiji Takeda 
 1993: Takafumi Nambu,  Mitsuru Ida,  and Kamon Yoshiyuki 
 1992: David A. Thompson 
 1991: Hideo Sunami 
 1990: Else Kooi 
 1989: Shun-ichi Iwasaki 
 1988: Irving Ames,  Francois M. d'Heurle,  Richard E. Horstmann

 1987: Michael Hatzakis
 1986: Richard M. White
 1985: Alec N. Broers
 1984: Harry W. Rubinstein
 1982: Robert H. Dennard
 1981: Donald R. Herriott
 1980: Marcian E. Hoff, Jr.
 1979: Philip J. Franklin
 1979: Geoffrey W. A. Dummer
 1978: Robert N. Noyce
 1978: Jack S. Kilby

External links 
 IEEE Cledo Brunetti Award page on IEEE web site

References 

Cledo Brunetti Award